Seton Academy was a Catholic coeducational college-preparatory high school in South Holland, Illinois.

History
Seton Academy, a Catholic College Preparatory High School located in South Holland, Illinois, was founded in 1963 by the Sisters of Charity of Saint Joseph, a religious order in Cincinnati, Ohio. Originally known as Elizabeth Seton High School, named in honor of Elizabeth Bayley Seton, the first native-born American saint and foundress of the Sisters of Charity, the school upheld its four founding cornerstones of Faith, Leadership, Scholarship and Community. Initially an all-girls school, it became coeducational in 2003.

On January 5, 2016, the Archdiocese of Chicago announced that Seton Academy would close at the end of the 2015–2016 school year due to declining enrollment and increasing operating costs.

Athletics
Girls Volleyball
Boys and Girls Cross Country 
Girls Basketball
Cheerleading
Track & Field
Baseball
Boys Basketball
Softball
Football

Notable alumni

D. J. Cooper (born 1990), basketball player in the Israeli Basketball Premier League

References

External links
Official website (archived)

Roman Catholic Archdiocese of Chicago
Catholic secondary schools in Illinois
Educational institutions established in 1963
Educational institutions disestablished in 2016
Private high schools in Cook County, Illinois
South Holland, Illinois
1963 establishments in Illinois
2016 disestablishments in Illinois